The  was a light bomber built by Mitsubishi for the Imperial Japanese Army Air Service (IJAAS) in the 1930s. Its Allied nickname was "Louise". Despite its antiquated appearance, the Ki-2 was successfully used in Manchukuo and in North China during the early stages of the Second Sino-Japanese War, in areas where danger from enemy fighter aircraft was minimal. It was later used in a training role.

Design and development
The Ki-2 was a low-wing cantilever monoplane with corrugated metal alloy decking, twin fins with rudders, fixed divided landing gear and was powered by two  Nakajima Kotobuki radial engines.

The Ki-2 was, like its stable mate the Mitsubishi Ki-1, an adaptation of the Junkers S36 first flown in 1927. Militarized into the Junkers K37 by Junker's Swedish subsidiary AB Flygindustri at Limhamn near Malmö in Sweden, it was able to reach altitudes unattainable by contemporary fighter aircraft. However, by 1930 this advantage had been lost due to developments such as the Bristol Bulldog fighter and Junkers was unsuccessful in selling the design. 

In 1931, representatives of the Mitsubishi Nainenki K.K. in Japan visited the Limhamn facilities to study some of the military conversions of Junkers aircraft, and purchased the sole K37 prototype S-AABP (ex D-1252 S36-prototype) as well as all development papers signing a contract for licensed production.

The K37 prototype was brought to Japan and tested in combat in the Manchurian Incident of 1931, following which the IJAAS authorized Mitsubishi to produce both heavy and light bomber variations. The Mitsubishi Ki-1 heavy bomber was a much larger new design following only the general arrangement of the K37 and first flew in August 1932.

The  Mitsubishi Ki-2 light bomber version, a minimally re-designed K37, flew for the first time in May 1933. The fuselage was redesigned by Mitsubishi, but the wings were kept largely unchanged, except for additional ailerons. Mitsubishi built total of 113 aircraft and an additional 13 aircraft were built by Kawasaki Kōkūki Kōgyō KK from 1933-1936.

An up-graded version was produced in quantity as the Ki-2-II (Army Type 93-II Twin-engined Light Bomber), with nose turret and semi-retractable main landing gear and powered by two  Mitsubishi Ha-8 (Army Type 94 550hp Air Cooled Radial) engines.

Operational history
Although already obsolescent by the time of its introduction, it was used with great success in the counterinsurgency operations of the Pacification of Manchukuo, and as well as limited use in the Second Sino-Japanese War in combat in north China.

Vulnerable to attack by enemy fighters, and replaced by aircraft with greater range and payload by the late 1930s, both versions ended their flying careers in the training role.
 
A civilian version of the Ki-2-II named Ohtori (Phoenix) was bought by the Asahi Shimbun newspaper and made a number of long-range record-breaking and "goodwill" flights from 1936 to 1939.

Variants
 Ki-2-I (Army Type 93-I Twin-engined Light Bomber)
Initial production variant, powered by two  Nakajima Kotobuki radial engines; 126 built.
 Ki-2-II (Army Type 93-II Twin-engined Light Bomber)
Final production variant with nose turret and semi-retractable main landing gear, powered by two  Mitsubishi Ha-8 (Army Type 94 550hp Air Cooled Radial) engines; 61 built.
 Mitsubishi  A de-militarized long-range record-breaking aircraft operated by Asahi Shimbun; 1 built. Was mistakenly given the Allied reporting name of Eva or Eve.

Operators

 Imperial Japanese Army Air Service
 Asahi Shimbun

Specifications (Ki-2-I)

See also

References

Notes

Bibliography

External links

 Junkers Aircraft of the 1920s

Ki-02, Mitsubishi
Ki-002
Low-wing aircraft
Aircraft first flown in 1933
Twin piston-engined tractor aircraft